Sugar nips are a large pair of pincers with sharp blades, designed to cut sugar from a block. Before the introduction of granulated and cube sugars in the second half of the 19th century, the domestic consumer purchased sugar in the form of a sugarloaf, or at least a part of one, and pieces were cut from it by hand using sugar nips. Greater leverage and improved safety was provided by heavier sugar nips set in a wooden base for counter- and table-top use.

There was also an all-in-one version; a box that could serve as container for the sugarloaf with built-in pliers and collector drawer for fine-grained residues from the sugar cutting.

In popular culture 
A pair of sugar nips are the murder weapon in Mrs McGinty's Dead, a Hercule Poirot mystery by Agatha Christie.

See also
 Panela

References

Sugar nips
Food preparation utensils